Afrogortyna altimontana is a moth of the family Noctuidae first described by Krüger in 1997. It is endemic to Lesotho.

External links
 

Xyleninae
Endemic fauna of Lesotho
Moths of Africa
Moths described in 1997